Fachtna Collins (born 1973) is an Irish former Gaelic footballer. At club level he played with Ilen Rovers divisional side Carbery and was also a member of the Cork senior football team.

Career

Collins first played Gaelic football at juvenile and underage levels with the Ilen Rovers club. He also lined out as a schoolboy with St. Fachtna's De La Salle College in Skibbereen and, after winning consecutive Corn Uí Mhuirí titles, won a Hogan Cup medal in 1991. As a student at University College Dublin, Collins captained the senior team to the Sigerson Cup title in 1996.

Collins progressed to adult level with his club and won numerous South West JAFC titles before winning a Cork JAFC title in 2001 and a Cork IAFC title in 2003. He was at midfield when Ilen Rovers beat St. Michael's to win the inaugural All-Ireland ICFC title in 2004. Collins also lined out with divisional side Carbery.

Collins first played for Cork as a member of the minor team that beat Mayo in the 1991 All-Ireland minor final. He later claimed All-Ireland honours as a member of the junior team in 1993 and with the under-21 team in 1994. Collins's performances with the junior team earned a call-up to the senior team in 1996. He won National League and Munster Championship titles in 1999, however, Cork were beaten by Meath in that year's All-Ireland final.

Honours

St. Fachtna's De La Salle College
Hogan Cup: 1991
Corn Uí Mhuirí: 1990, 1991

University College Dublin
Sigerson Cup: 1996 (c)

Ilen Rovers
All-Ireland Intermediate Club Football Championship: 2004
Munster Intermediate Club Football Championship: 2003
Cork Intermediate Football Championship: 2003
Cork Junior A Football Championship: 2001
South West Junior A Football Championship: 1996, 1999, 2000, 2001

Cork
Munster Senior Football Championship: 1999
National Football League: 1998–99
All-Ireland Junior Football Championship: 1993
Munster Junior Football Championship: 1993
All-Ireland Under-21 Football Championship: 1994
Munster Under-21 Football Championship: 1994
All-Ireland Minor Football Championship: 1991
Munster Minor Football Championship: 1991

References

1973 births
Living people
UCD Gaelic footballers
Ilen Rovers Gaelic footballers
Carbery Gaelic footballers
Cork inter-county Gaelic footballers
Munster inter-provincial Gaelic footballers